Colby French is an American television actor, best known for playing the role of Hank on the NBC television drama Heroes. He is also known for playing Yankee on The Suite Life of Zack & Cody, CAPT Mike Murphy on 24, and he also played CAPT Evan Thorn on Last Resort. In 2016, he appeared in 3 episodes of American Horror Story: Roanoke.  He played an undercover cop in “Better Call Saul’s” fourth-season episode, “Something Stupid”.

Filmography

Television

External links

American male television actors
Living people
Year of birth missing (living people)